Ross Golan (born April 8, 1980) is a multi-award-winning, multi-platinum selling, American songwriter, record producer and playwright.

Life and career

Early career
Golan graduated from Deerfield High School (Illinois) of Deerfield, Illinois in 1998. He studied music at the University of Southern California, and has since released songs with artists including Maroon 5, Justin Bieber, Celine Dion, Nicki Minaj, Gwen Stefani, Lady Antebellum, Michael Bublé, Selena Gomez, Keith Urban, Ariana Grande, Flo Rida, Enrique Iglesias, One Direction, P!nk, The Dixie Chicks, Pitbull, Lauv, Idina Menzel, Nelly, Luis Fonsi, Demi Lovato, Jason Derulo, Meghan Trainor, Cee Lo Green, 5 Seconds of Summer, Linkin Park, Prince Royce, Snoop Dogg, Charlie Puth, James Taylor, Avril Lavigne, Little Mix, Gavin DeGraw, Colbie Caillat, Andy Grammer, James Blunt, Big Sean, Travis Barker, Lukas Graham, Sabrina Carpenter, Skylar Grey, Rixton, The Vamps and Icona Pop, among others. He is the 2016 BMI "Pop Songwriter of the Year" and is currently published by Warner/Chappell Music. His concept album The Wrong Man was released worldwide by Interscope Records on 26 July 2019.

Early Record Deals
Golan had multiple record deals, the first in 2003 with Insider Trading Corporation/EMI, which was a label he started while in school. The label teamed up with EMI's then-president Phil Quatararo, releasing Reagan Baby. After that, Golan co-founded Glacier Hiking, which had a hybrid publishing/label deal with Lionsgate - the band released a self-titled EP before breaking up in 2009.

The Wrong Man
Golan developed a musical called The Wrong Man, based on the concept music album, which is about a man who is wrongly accused of a crime committed in Reno, Nevada.  A one-man version of the show, starring Golan, ran in Los Angeles in February 2014 and received three Ovation Award wins out of four nominations. The musical made its way to New York City, playing Off-Broadway to previews beginning 18 September 2019, with an October 7 opening and scheduled run through 24 November 2019 at the Robert W. Wilson MCC Theater Space. The full-cast stage production included Tony winners and nominees Tommy Kail, Alex Lacamoire and Joshua Henry. The Wrong Man received 9 Drama Desk Awards nominations including Best Musical and 3 Lucille Lortel Awards nominations. The show was also honored with four Outer Critics Circle Awards including best original score for Golan.

The concept album was released worldwide by Interscope Records on 26 July 2019. That version made it to the big screen, with an animated film adaptation written and performed by Golan. The movie premiered at the Tribeca Film Festival in April 2019.

Podcast
Golan is also the podcast host of And the Writer Is... which is co-produced by Joe London. It has garnered three million downloads.

Advocacy
In 2016, Golan co-authored an initiative to include songwriters in the Grammy Awards "Album of the Year" category, and 2017 marked the first year a songwriter received a statue for the award. In 2018, he was a leading voice in the Music Modernization Act. In 2019, he became the first songwriter to sit on the board of directors of the National Music Publishers Association in the 100-plus year history of that organization. In 2021, he advocated to have the 33% rule eradicated from the Grammy Awards "Album of the Year" category and in 2022, all songwriters, producers and engineers who worked on a nominated album will for the first time be recognized as nominees.

Notable song credits

Awards and nominations
Ovation Awards
2014: Winner, "Video/Projection Design" - Michael Hoy and Adam Flemming, for the Skylight Theatre Company production of The Wrong Man.
2014: Winner, "Lyrics/Music for an Original Musical" - Ross Golan, for the Skylight Theatre Company production of The Wrong Man.
2014: Winner, "Book for an Original Musical" - Ross Golan, for the Skylight Theatre Company production of The Wrong Man.
2014: Nominee, "Best Production of a Musical (Intimate Theatre)" - Skylight Theatre Company, for the production of The Wrong Man.

BMI Awards
2016: Winner, "Pop Songwriter of the Year".

Outer Critics Circle Award
2020: Winner, "Best Original Score" - for the MCC production of The Wrong Man.

Drama Desk Award
2020: Nominee, "Outstanding Score" - for the MCC production of The Wrong Man.
2020: Nominee, "Outstanding Musical" - for the MCC production of The Wrong Man.

References

1980 births
Living people
American singer-songwriters
American podcasters
21st-century American singers
People from Deerfield, Illinois